The 152nd Indiana Infantry Regiment was an infantry regiment from Indiana that served in the Union Army between March 16 and August 30, 1865, during the American Civil War.

Service 
The regiment was recruited from the 9th, 10th, and 11th districts and organized at Indianapolis, Indiana, with a strength of 988 men. It was mustered in on March 16, 1865, and left Indiana for Harper's Ferry, West Virginia on March 18. At Harper's Ferry, it was assigned to duty with one of the provisional divisions of the Army of Shenandoah. The regiment saw duty at Charleston, Stevenson's Station, Summit Point and Clarksburg, West Virginia, until late August, 1865. The regiment was mustered out on August 30, 1865. During its service the regiment incurred forty-eight fatalities, and another twenty-two men deserted.

See also
 List of Indiana Civil War regiments

Notes

References

Bibliography 
 Dyer, Frederick H. (1959). A Compendium of the War of the Rebellion. New York and London. Thomas Yoseloff, Publisher. .
 Holloway, William R. (2004). Civil War Regiments From Indiana. eBookOnDisk.com Pensacola, Florida. .
 Terrell, W.H.H. (1867). The Report of the Adjutant General  of the State of Indiana. Containing Rosters for the Years 1861–1865, Volume 7. Indianapolis, Indiana. Samuel M. Douglass, State Printer.

Units and formations of the Union Army from Indiana
1865 establishments in Indiana
Military units and formations established in 1865
Military units and formations disestablished in 1865